Far East Command (FECOM) was a unified combatant command of the United States Department of Defense, active from 1947 until 1957, functionally organised to undertake the occupation of Japan and Korea. The 1st and 6th Marine Divisions (China Marines), who from 1945 to 1948 assisted the Chinese government in occupying northern China, disarming the Japanese, and helping the Kuomintang Chinese without fully getting involved in the Chinese Civil War, were not part of Far East Command and reported to Pacific Command and the U.S. Navy.

History
Far East Command was created on 1 January 1947, and abolished, with functions transferred to Pacific Command, effective 1 July 1957. From 1947–51 the Commander-in-Chief, Far East (CINCFE), was General Douglas MacArthur, who was then succeeded by Generals Matthew Ridgway and Mark Clark. Later commanders were Generals John E. Hull, Maxwell D. Taylor, and finally Lyman Lemnitzer.

Its initial army forces in 1947 comprised Eighth Army, XXIV Corps/U.S. Army Forces in Korea, and the Ryukyus, Philippines and Marianas-Bonins Commands (MARBO). There was no overall headquarters for the ground elements within the Far East Command, and the five separate ground commands reported directly to CINCFE. Far East Air Forces and Naval Forces Far East also reported directly to CINCFE, initially giving MacArthur seven subordinate military headquarters.

The Marianas-Bonins Command (MARBO) was established in January 1947 as result a major reorganization of U.S. military forces in the Asia/Pacific region. The MARBO SSI was approved on 8 August 1948. Whether to place the Bonin and Mariana Islands under United States Pacific Command or FECOM became a bone of contention. The Navy saw all Pacific islands as one strategic entity, while the Army insisted that FECOM be able to draw upon military resources in the Bonin-Marianas during an emergency. Accordingly CINCFE was given control over local forces and facilities in the islands, while naval administration and logistics there fell under Commander-in-Chief, Pacific Command.

Following signing of the Japanese Instrument of Surrender, 2 September 1945, the Ryukyu Islands were administered by the Department of the Navy, 21 September 1945 – 30 June 1946, with Commanding Officer, Naval Operating Base, Okinawa functioning as chief military government officer under authority of Commander-in-Chief, U.S. Pacific Fleet. Transfer of administration from the Department of the Navy to the War Department was authorized by Joint Chiefs of Staff (JCS) approval, 1 April 1946. Pursuant to implementing instructions of General Headquarters U.S. Army Forces in the Pacific (GHQ AFPAC), the Okinawa Base Command was redesignated Ryukyus Command, effective 1 July 1946, by General Order 162, Headquarters U.S. Army Forces, Western Pacific, and made responsible for administration under a Deputy Commander for Military Government. The Ryukyu Islands was administered successively by Ryukyus Command, 1 July – 30 November 1946; and Philippines-Ryukyus Command, 1 December 1946 – 31 July 1948; and Ryukyuan Command, 1 August 1948 – 15 December 1950. All were seemingly headquartered at Fort Buckner near Futenma.

The PHILRYCOM marriage of convenience did not last out 1948, as the command was separated into a Philippine Command (PHILCOM) and a Ryukyus Command (RYCOM) on 1 August 1948 (SCAP, GHQ General Order Number 18, 9 July 1948).

In June 1950 GHQ, FEC, located in Tokyo, Japan, with main offices in the Dai Ichi Building, had Maj. Gen. Edward M. Almond as chief of staff and Maj. Gen. Doyle O. Hickey as deputy chief of staff. The major subordinate Army commands were Eighth Army, commanded by Lt. Gen. Walton H. Walker; Headquarters and Service Group, GHQ, commanded by Maj. Gen. Walter L. Weible; the Ryukyus Command (RYCOM) under Maj. Gen. Josef R. Sheetz; and the Marianas-Bonins Command (MARBO) headed by Maj. Gen. Robert S. Beightler. In the Philippines, the Thirteenth Air Force controlled U.S. installations through PHILCOM (AF), a small and rapidly diminishing headquarters commanded by Maj. Gen. Howard M. Turner USAF. Naval Forces, Far East, were commanded by Vice Adm. C. Turner Joy. Far East Air Forces came under Lt. Gen. George E. Stratemeyer. FEAF and NavFE headquarters were located in Tokyo in buildings separate from GHQ, FEC. XVI Corps was activated in April 1951 as the command reserve.

In 1951, during the Korean War, the Joint Chiefs of Staff shifted responsibility for the Bonins and Marianas as well as the Philippines and Taiwan from FECOM to PACOM.

The United States Civil Administration of the Ryukyu Islands (USCAR) was established, effective 15 December 1950, by a directive of Headquarters Far East Command. That directive ordered Commander-in-Chief Far East, Gen. Douglas MacArthur, to organize a civil administration for the Ryukyu Islands in accordance with JCS 1231/14 October 4, 1950. USCAR continued to function under the Department of the Army (formerly the War Department) from 1950 to 1971.

Commanders in chief

References

Further reading
Hal M. Friedman, Arguing Over the American Lake: Bureaucracy and Rivalry in the U.S. Pacific, 1945–1947, Volume 126 of Texas A & M University military history series: Texas A and M University, Texas A&M University Press, 2009, 9781603441254.
The History of the Unified Command Plan 1946 – 1993

Unified combatant commands of the U.S. Department of Defense
United States military in the Philippines
Ryukyu Islands
Okinawa under United States occupation
Military units and formations established in 1947